This is a partial list of molecules that contain 13 carbon atoms.

See also
Carbon number
 List of compounds with carbon number 12
 List of compounds with carbon number 14

C13